The Tour of the Alps is an annual professional cycling stage race in Italy and Austria. First held in 1962, it was named Giro del Trentino until 2016, and run over four stages in the Trentino-Alto Adige/Südtirol region of Italy. In 2015, the race merged with the nearby one-day race Trofeo Melinda, and the 2015 edition was called the Giro del Trentino Melinda.

In 2017, the event was renamed Tour of the Alps, as it addresses the entire Euroregion of Tyrol–South Tyrol–Trentino, formed by three different regional authorities in two countries: the Austrian state of Tyrol and the Italian autonomous provinces of South Tyrol and Trentino. It should not be confused with the similarly named Giro al Sas di Trento, an annual road running competition in the city of Trento.

Since its rebranding, the race is run mid-to-late April over five stages, as a 2.HC event of the UCI Europe Tour, the level beneath the UCI World Tour. The race became part of the new UCI ProSeries in 2020.

The Tour of the Alps, typically featuring short and mountainous stages, is considered a last preparation race for the key contenders of the Giro d'Italia, which starts two weeks after the Tour of the Alps finishes. Ten winners of the Giro del Trentino have also won the Giro d'Italia, all of them Italians: Francesco Moser, Giuseppe Saronni, Franco Chioccioli, Gianni Bugno, Gilberto Simoni, Paolo Savoldelli, Damiano Cunego, Vincenzo Nibali, Ivan Basso and Michele Scarponi. Damiano Cunego holds the race record with three overall wins.

History

The first edition of the race was held in 1962. It consisted of a single stage that started and finished in Trento. It was won by Enzo Moser. After a second edition in 1963, the third edition was not held until 1979. There were two unofficial races, in 1977 and 1978 but they remain disputed and usually not treated as official Giro del Trentino races. The 1986 edition of the race was unusual in that there was no individual prize awarded. One of the stages of the 1995 Giro del Trentino went to Innsbruck in neighbouring Austria, and stages to and from Lienz in Austria have remained a regular feature of the race since that time. In 2012, the race included a team time trial for the first time, which constituted the first stage of the race. The team time-trial was retained for the 2013 edition.

List of winners

Repeat winners

Wins per nation

References

External links
 

 
Cycle races in Italy
Recurring sporting events established in 1962
1962 establishments in Italy
UCI Europe Tour races
Sport in Trentino
Sport in South Tyrol
Sport in Tyrol (state)